Jean Martinet (2 April 1898 – 29 October 1980) was a Swiss racing cyclist. He rode in the 1924 Tour de France.

References

1898 births
1980 deaths
Swiss male cyclists
Place of birth missing